Roxanne Beck is an American screenwriter, children's book author and voice actress. Her writing credits include the screenplay for the short film "Miss Famous" (2015) starring Kristen Wiig and the children's book "Caterpillarland" (Chakra 4 Publishing, 2015). Beck earned her MFA in Screenwriting at UCLA, where her awards included a Humanitas Drama Fellowship nomination. Her jazz/blues release "Comes Love", produced by Grammy nominee Bud Harner, received national radio airplay in 2008; her first album, Garden of Love, was released in 1997. She is also an internationally known voice actress who voiced characters on anime films released in the U.S. by Central Park Media, 4kids Entertainment and Right Stuf Inc. Originally from Searcy, Arkansas, she now lives in Los Angeles.

Voice credits
 Ayane's High Kick - Kayoko
 Boogiepop Phantom - Arisa Nishi, Rie Sato
 Gall Force - Amy (Movies 2-3)
 Garzey's Wing - Falan Fa
 Gokudo - Princess Oto
 K.O. Beast - Mei-Mer's Mother
 Patlabor the Mobile Police - Additional Voices
 Pokémon - Vulpix, Giselle, Rebecca, Ramona, Ariene (Seasons 1-5)
 Pokémon 4Ever - Diana
 Record of Lodoss War: Chronicles of the Heroic Knight - Kardis, Little Neese
 Revolutionary Girl Utena - Wakaba Shinohara, Kozue Kaoru
 Urusei Yatsura 2: Beautiful Dreamer - Lum (Credited as "Ann Ulrey")
 VH1's ILL-ustrated - Hermione, Monica Lewinsky, Dr. Melfi

References

Living people
American members of the Churches of Christ
American voice actresses
Harding University alumni
People from Searcy, Arkansas
Place of birth missing (living people)
Year of birth missing (living people)
21st-century American women